Márton Garas (1881–1930) was a Hungarian film director.

Selected filmography
Director
 Három het (1917)
 Anna Karenina (1918)
 Oliver Twist (1919)
 Sappho (1920)
 New-York express kábel (1921)
 Christopher Columbus (1923)
 Farsangi mámor (1923)

Actor
 Struggling Hearts (1916)

Screenwriter
 Two and a Lady (1926)

Bibliography
 Cunningham, John. Hungarian Cinema: From Coffee House to Multiplex. Wallflower Press, 2004.

External links

 

1881 births
1930 deaths
Hungarian film directors
German-language film directors
People from Novi Sad